El Baúl is a Pre-Columbian archaeological site in present-day Escuintla Department, Guatemala.  El Baúl, along with the sites of Bilbao and El Castillo, is part of the Cotzumalhuapa Archaeological Zone.  It was occupied during the prehistoric Formative stage of the Americas.

Site
Its southern acropolis complex was destroyed in 1997 by urban development and the main groups are now covered by sugar cane fields. It is united by two causeways. The site's geologic context is volcanic; it is located just south of an active stratovolcano, Fuego volcano.

The site contains monumental architecture in its acropolis as well as a probable sweatbath and obsidian workshops. Analysis of these deposits is particularly important for the study of the ancient obsidian industry. Obsidian debitage continued below these ash layers, suggesting that the area was used as a refuse deposit for a prolonged period.

Before entering El Baúl, the causeway ran across a large bridge over the Santiago River gorge. The foundation walls of the bridge, which most probably sustained a wooden structure, are still visible along a 3 span of the river course. An excavation carried out on the western side of the river gorge revealed two constructional stages for the causeway at this location, both of which date to the Late Classic period. Many monumental sculptures have been found along the causeways.

See also
Bilbao (Mesoamerican site)

References

External links

El Baúl and surrounding sites, history and photo gallery
The Delanges visit El Baul, with many photos

Baul, El
Archaeological sites in Guatemala
Former populated places in Guatemala
Escuintla Department
Formative period in the Americas
Classic period in Mesoamerica